The 2012 Wainwright Roaming Buffalo Classic was held from November 16 to 19 at the Wainwright Curling Club in Wainwright, Alberta as part of the 2012–13 World Curling Tour. The event was held in a triple knockout format, and the purse for the event was CAD$55,000. In the final, Mark Johnson's Seattle, Washington rink defeated Jamie King of Alberta with a score of 4–3 and won his third title at the Wainwright Roaming Buffalo Classic.

Teams
The teams are listed as follows:

Knockout results
The draw is listed as follows:

A event

B event

C event

Playoffs

References

External links

2012 in Canadian curling
Curling in Alberta